Untash-Napirisha was king of Elam (in present-day southwest Iran) during the Middle Elamite period, circa 1300 BCE. He was the son of the previous Elamite king, Humban-Numena. He was named after Napirisha, an Elamite deity.

He founded and built extensively a new city, Dur-Untash, 40 km SE of Susa, modern Chogha Zanbil. He built extensively in this city, and its main temple, the famous Ziggurat, still stands there. Although construction in this religious city complex abruptly ended after Untash-Napirisha's death, the site was not abandoned, but continued to be occupied until it was destroyed by the Assyrian king Ashurbanipal in 640 BC.

Untash Napirirsha also left numerous building inscriptions for more than 50 temples and buildings, either built or renovated during his reign, in Chogha Zanbil, Susa, Choga Gotvand and other places.

A later Elamite letter from Berlin Pergamon Museum (VAT17020) mentions that he was married to “the daughter of Burna-buriash (a Babylonian king) and she bore him a son (and the future Elamite king) Kidin-hudurdish (Hutran)". If this was the Babylonian king Burna-Buriash II, then the reign of Untash-Napirisha could be dated ca 1340–1300 BC. However, some scholars consider a different model for the synchronism between Kassite dynasty in Babylone and the Elamite kings, and suggest that the mentioned Burna-buriash was a later prince, and that the reign of Untash-Napirisha could be dated ca. 1275–1240 BC; see, for example The Berlin Letter, Middle Elamite Chronology and Sutruk-Nahhunte I's Genealogy.

References

Elamite people
14th-century BC rulers
Elamite kings
Igihalkid Dynasty